UK-432,097 is a drug developed by Pfizer for the treatment of chronic obstructive pulmonary disease, which acts as a potent and selective agonist of the adenosine A2A receptor. It was discontinued from clinical trials following poor efficacy results, but its high selectivity has made it useful for detailed mapping of the internal structure of the A2A receptor.

References 

Adenosine receptor agonists
Abandoned drugs